Sillar is a variety of rhyolite, which is a type of volcanic rock. Although sillar is of rhyolitic composition, it has been erupted from volcanoes which mostly erupt andesite lava, and sillar contains small fragments of andesite. A pink variety of sillar owes its colour to crystals of hematite within the rock. A white variety lacks these hematite crystals. Sillar is found as pyroclastic flow deposits of tuff near volcanoes in southern Peru, for example the now-extinct Chachani volcano which erupted flows of sillar during the Pleistocene epoch.

Sillar facies Orvieto-Bagnoregio Ignimbrite (black blocks of scoria in red tuff) occurs at Civita di Bagnoregio in the Vulsini volcanic district of central Italy.

Building stone
Sillar has been used as a building stone in Peru. Many colonial buildings in the city of Arequipa are made of sillar, for example, the arches of the "Mirador of Yanahuara" in Arequipa, from which the entire city can be viewed.

See also

References

 Composition of sillar from Maricopa Center for Learning and Instruction
 Information Arequipa

Volcanic rocks
Building stone
Architecture in Peru

es:Toba volcánica#Sillar de Arequipa